Parliamentary elections were held in Bulgaria on 23 February 1914. The result was a victory for the Liberal Concentration, an alliance of the Liberal Party, the People's Liberal Party and the Young Liberals Party, which won 126 of the 245 seats. Voter turnout was 67%.

Results

References

Bulgaria
1914 in Bulgaria
Parliamentary elections in Bulgaria
February 1914 events
1914 elections in Bulgaria